The 1971 Billie Jean King Invitational was a women's tennis tournament that took place in Long Beach in the United States. It was part of the 1971 Virginia Slims Circuit and began on January 14, 1971. First seeded Billie Jean King win the singles title.

Finals

Singles

 Billie Jean King defeated  Rosie Casals 6–1, 6–2

Doubles
 Billie Jean King /  Rosie Casals defeated  Françoise Dürr /  Ann Jones 7–5, 6–3

References

External links
 1971 Billie Jean King Invitational draw

Billie Jean King Invitational 
VS of Long Beach
LA Women's Tennis Championships
Billie Jean King Invitational 
Billie Jean King Invitational